Bernard George Betke (April 12, 1891 – April 18, 1975) was an American sport shooter who competed in the 1924 Summer Olympics.

In 1924, he finished in 10th place in the 25 m rapid fire pistol competition.

He was born in Milwaukee, Wisconsin and died in Beaufort, South Carolina.

References

1891 births
1975 deaths
American male sport shooters
United States Distinguished Marksman
ISSF pistol shooters
Olympic shooters of the United States
Shooters at the 1924 Summer Olympics
Sportspeople from Milwaukee